The Bengal Renaissance (Bengali: বাংলার নবজাগরণ — Banglar Navajagaran), also known as the Bengali Renaissance, was a cultural, social, intellectual, and artistic movement that took place in the Bengal region of the British Raj, from the late 18th century to the early 20th century. Historians have traced the beginnings of the movement to the victory of the British East India Company at the 1757 Battle of Plassey, as well as the works of reformer Raja Rammohan Roy, considered the "Father of the Bengal Renaissance," born in 1772. Nitish Sengupta stated that the movement "can be said to have … ended with Rabindranath Tagore," Asia's first Nobel laureate.

For almost two centuries, the Bengal renaissance saw the radical transformation of Indian society, and its ideas have been attributed to the rise of Indian anticolonialist and nationalist thought and activity during this period. The philosophical basis of the movement was its unique version of liberalism and modernity. According to Sumit Sarkar, the pioneers and works of this period were revered and regarded with nostalgia throughout the 19th and 20th centuries, however, due to a new focus on its colonialist origins, a more critical view emerged in the 1970s.

The Bengali renaissance was predominantly led by Bengali Hindus, who at the time were socially and economically more affluent in colonial Bengal, and therefore better placed for higher education as a community. Well-known figures include the social reformer Raja Rammohan Roy, writer Rabindranath Tagore, and the physicist Satyendra Nath Bose. The main Muslim figures in the movement include members of the Suhrawardy family, poet and musician Kazi Nazrul Islam and writer Rokeya Sakhawat Hussain.

Background 
The Bengal Renaissance was a movement characterised by a sociopolitical awakening in the arts, literature, music, philosophy, religion, science, and other fields of intellectual inquiry. The movement questioned the existing customs and rituals in Indian society – most notably, the caste system, and the practice of sati, idolatry– as well as the role of religion and colonial governance. In turn, the Bengal Renaissance advocated for societal reform – the kind that adhered to secularist, humanist and modernist ideals. From Rabindranath Tagore to Satyendra Nath Bose, the movement saw the emergence of important figures, whose contributions still influence cultural and intellectual works today.

Although the Bengal Renaissance was led and dominated by upper caste Hindus, Bengali Muslims played a transformative role in the movement, as well as the shaping of colonial and postcolonial Indian society. Examples of Bengali Muslim renaissance men and women include Kazi Nazrul Islam, Ubaidullah Al Ubaidi Suhrawardy, Rokeya Sakhawat Hussain and Sake Dean Mahomed. Some Muslim figures significantly influenced the development of the various national identities across the Indian subcontinent, and in particular, post-partition and post-independence, Bangladesh. When it came to cultural and religious reform, the Freedom of Intellect Movement was established in 1926 to challenge the social customs and dogmas in Bengali Muslim society.

From the mid-eighteenth century, the Bengal Province, and more specifically, its capital city of Calcutta, was the centre of British power in India. The region was the base for British imperial rule until the capital was moved to Delhi in 1911. Prior to Crown control, British power was in the hands of the East India Company, which in course of time, became increasingly profitable and influential, politically, establishing diplomatic relations with local rulers as well as building armies to protect its own interests.

During this time, partly through the 1757 Battle of Plassey against the Nawab of Bengal and his French allies, and in part through the fall of the Mughal Empire, the Company was able to acquire extensive territory in the Bengal and Ganges basin. The expense of these wars, however, threatened the Company’s financial situation, and in 1773, the Regulating Act was passed to stabilise the EIC as well as subject it to some parliamentary control. Further legislation over the next several decades progressively brought about tighter controls over the Company, but the Indian Rebellion of 1857 forced the British parliament to pass the Government of India Act 1858, which saw the liquidation of the EIC and the transfer of power to the British Crown.

Origins

The Bengali Renaissance originated in the Bengal Presidency of the British Indian Empire, but more specifically, its capital city of Kolkata, then known as Calcutta. This colonial metropolis was the first non-Western city to use British methods of teaching in their school system. In 1817, the urban elite led by Raja Ram Mohan Roy cofounded the Hindu or Presidency College in Kolkata, now known as the Presidency University, the only European-style institution of higher learning in Asia at the time. The city was also home to a public library, the Imperial Library, now the National Library of India, and newspapers and books were being published regularly in both Bengali and English. "Print language and literature played a vital role in shaping ideas and identities in colonial Bengal from the 18th century onwards," writes Anindita Ghosh, continuing that "… commercial print cultures that emanated from numerous cheap presses in Calcutta and its suburbs disseminated wide-ranging literary preferences that afforded a space to different sections of the Bengali middle classes to voice their own distinctive concerns."

The Bengal Province was the base for British East India Company rule until the overthrow of the Nawab of Bengal at the Battle of Plassey in 1757, which marked the Crown's consolidation of power in India. Many postcolonial historians source the origins of the Bengal Renaissance to these events, arguing that the movement was both a reaction to the violence and exploitation by the British Raj, as well as a product of the Empire's promotion of English education in the region as part of its "civilising missions". For instance, Sivanath Sastri notes that Charles Grant, a British politician influential in Indian affairs who also served as Chairman of the East India Company, "moved "that a thorough education be given to the different races inhabiting the country, [and] that the Gospel be preached to them… ."" Moreover, Arabinda Poddar contends that the English education of Bengalis was intended to create "mere political slaves," arguing that, "the civilising role of English education, stressed the need of creating a class of Anglophiles who would have a somewhat in-between existence between the rulers and the ruled."

Other historians cite the works of "Father of the Bengal Renaissance," Raja Rammohun Roy, as the start of the Bengal Renaissance. Roy, by 1829, co-founded the Brahmo Sabha movement, later renamed the Brahmo Samaj by  Debendranath Tagore. It was an influential socioreligious reform movement that made significant contributions to the renaissance, as well as the makings of modern Indian society.

Education
   
Among the many changes brought about by the Bengal Renaissance in India was the development of education, both in the Bengali language and in English. Colonial provisions at the time consisted mainly of village schools teaching literacy and numeracy, Arabic and Islamic studies being taught to Muslims in madrasas, and tols, where pandits instructed Sanskrit texts to Brahmins, which were supported by endowments. These institutions were exclusively male, and in the rare cases where girls could get an education, it was in the home. The work of Christian missions also had more of an influence on Indian students than the initiatives of the government. While the East India Company Act of 1813 allotted 100,000 rupees from the government's surplus to be "applied to the revival and improvement of literature, and the encouragement of the learned natives of India, and for the introduction and promotion of a knowledge of the sciences," it did not lead to any coherent provision of public education.

According to Dermot Killingley, the surplus mentioned in this Charter Act was “an aspiration, not a budget item,” and even if the money had been provided for, there was uncertainty about how it should be spent. Recurring questions arose over whether to invest on a few advanced institutions or to promote widespread elementary education, what language to use, and particularly whether to support traditional methods of learning in India, which had declined due to the loss of patronage, or to introduce a new system based on Western education. Rammohan Roy contributed to this last debate by writing to the Governor-General in 1823 expressing his opposition to the establishment of a Sanskrit College that would foster traditional learning and advocating for Western scientific education; this effort failed without effect. Missionaries began teaching young women in 1816, but a systematic education policy was not established until 1854. However, Sengupta and Purkayastha point out that even during the 1860s and 1870s, “the project of female education was wholly tied to the purpose of enabling women to better discharge their domestic duties.”

Despite the East India Company's initial hostility to missionaries, the colonial government later saw the advantages of their contribution to educating and training the local population. This was especially because, as Killingley noted, “in the innovations of the early nineteenth century, government initiative had less impact than the work of Christian missions, and of individuals … who responded to the demand for literacy, numeracy and related skills created by growing commercial and administrative activity.” In 1800, the Baptist Missionary Society established a centre in Srirampur, West Bengal, from which it ran a network of schools that taught literacy, mathematics, physics, geography and other so-called “useful knowledge.” Other missionary societies followed soon after, working along similar lines. These missionaries, which were largely dependent on local, indigenous teachers and families, and the colonial government, which sometimes supported them with grants, were also cautious about introducing Christian teachings or the Bible.
 
Education was also believed to be necessary in reversing the apparent moral decline many colonial administrators saw in Bengal society. To give an example, a British judge in Bengal recommended the London Missionary Society's schools, “for the dissemination of morality and general improvement of society among natives of all persuasion without interfering with their religious prejudices.” Missionaries, however, were not the only channels through which education was promoted. For instance, individuals in Calcutta such as Rammohan Roy, the conservative Hindu scholar, Radhakanta Deb to the atheist philanthropist, David Hare, and other British officials often collaborated in the Calcutta School Book Society and the Calcutta School Society. Some of the other institutions of learning established during this period include the Chittagong College; Indian Statistical Institute; the Hindu School, the oldest modern educational institution in Asia; Jadavpur University; Presidency University, Kolkata; the University of Calcutta, the University of Dhaka, the oldest university in Bangladesh; and Visva-Bharati University.

Science
 

During the Bengal Renaissance science was also advanced by several Bengali scientists such as Satyendra Nath Bose, Ashutosh Mukherjee, Anil Kumar Gain, Prasanta Chandra Mahalanobis, Prafulla Chandra Ray, Debendra Mohan Bose, Jagadish Chandra Bose, Jnan Chandra Ghosh, Gopal Chandra Bhattacharya, Kishori Mohan Bandyopadhyay, Jnanendra Nath Mukherjee, Sisir Kumar Mitra, Upendranath Brahmachari and Meghnad Saha.

Jagadish Chandra Bose (1858–1937) was a polymath: a physicist, biologist, botanist, archaeologist, and writer of science fiction. He pioneered the investigation of radio and microwave optics, made very significant contributions to botany, and laid the foundations of experimental science in the Indian subcontinent. He is considered one of the fathers of radio science, and is also considered the father of Bengali science fiction. He also invented the crescograph.

Arts 
 
 
 
The Bengal School of Art was an art movement and a style of Indian painting that originated in Bengal and flourished throughout British India in the early 20th century. Also known as 'Indian style of painting' in its early days, it was associated with Indian nationalism (swadeshi) and led by Abanindranath Tagore.

Following the influence of Indian spiritual ideas in the West, the British art teacher Ernest Binfield Havell attempted to reform the teaching methods at the Calcutta School of Art by encouraging students to imitate Mughal miniatures. This caused controversy, leading to a strike by students and complaints from the local press, including from nationalists who considered it to be a retrogressive move. Havell was supported by the artist Abanindranath Tagore.

Literature
 

According to historian Romesh Chunder Dutt:

Religion and spirituality 

The Renaissance also embraced the religious sphere, bringing forward spiritual figures such as Ram Mohan Roy, Debendranath Tagore, Keshab Chandra Sen, Bijoy Krishna Goswami, Ramakrishna, Sarada Devi, Swami Vivekananda, Aurobindo, Bamakhepa,Lokenath Brahmachari, Bhaktisiddhanta Sarasvati, Bhaktivinoda Thakur, Paramahansa Yogananda, Lahiri Mahasaya, Tibbetibaba, Nigamananda Paramahansa, Vishuddhananda Paramahansa, Ram Thakur, Sitaramdas Omkarnath, Anandamayi Ma as well as following related to them new reformist movements and organizations.
 Brahmoism (Brahmo Samaj)
 Adi Brahmo Samaj
 Sadharan Brahmo Samaj
 Gaudiya Math
 Mahanam Sampraday
 Ramakrishna Mission
 Ramakrishna Math
 Sri Aurobindo Ashram
 Yogoda Satsanga Society of India
 Self-Realization Fellowship

References

Further reading

 
 
 Fraser, Bashabi edited Special Issue on Rabindranath Tagore, Literary Compass, Wiley Publications. Volume 12, Issue 5, May 2015. See Fraser's Introduction pp. 161–172. .

External links

 

 

 
Brahmoism
Bengali culture
 
Culture of West Bengal
Hindu movements
Bengal Presidency
Indian independence movement
History of social movements
19th century in India
20th century in India